Siedenburg is a municipality in the district of Diepholz, in Lower Saxony, Germany. It is situated approximately 20 km west of Nienburg.

Siedenburg is also the seat of the Samtgemeinde ("collective municipality") Siedenburg.

References

Diepholz (district)